Nicholas Ammeter (born 11 December 2000) is a Swiss footballer who plays as a goalkeeper for Wil.

Career

Club career
Ammeter started his career with Swiss second tier side Aarau. In 2018, he was sent on loan to FC Baden in the Swiss third tier. In 2021, Ammeter was sent on loan to Swiss top flight club YB, where he made 1 league appearances and scored 0 goals. On 12 December 2021, he debuted for YB during a 4–3 win over Sion.

On 10 June 2022, Ammeter signed a two-year contract with Wil.

International career
Ammeter is eligible to represent the United States internationally, having been born there.

References

External links

2000 births
Living people
Swiss men's footballers
Association football goalkeepers
Switzerland youth international footballers
FC Aarau players
FC Baden players
BSC Young Boys players
FC Wil players
Soccer players from New York City
Swiss Super League players
Swiss Challenge League players
Swiss Promotion League players
Swiss 1. Liga (football) players
2. Liga Interregional players